Carry On Deshpande is an Indian Marathi language film directed by Vijay Patkar. The film stars Pushkar Shrotri, Hemlata Bane, Sagar Karande, Sanjay Khapre and Manasi Naik. Music by Chinar–Mahesh. The film was released on 11 December 2015.

Synopsis 
Casanova Shashi Deshpande has two wives who are suspicious of his activities. Things take a different turn when he meets Mallika, his third love interest.

Soundtrack

Critical reception 
Carry On Deshpande film received negative reviews from critics. Mihir Bhanage of The Times of India gave the film 2 stars out of 5 and wrote "It has been made with a particular set of audience in mind and perhaps would also strike a chord with item-song enthusiasts". Ganesh Matkari of Pune Mirror wrote "Just like we invented the new serious Marathi cinema, maybe it’s time to evolve a new comedy — something that pleases all, but which won’t be a rehash of the tired old routines". Soumitra Pote of Maharashtra Times gave the film 2 stars out of 5 and wrote "The movie starts with the song 'Mai Hoon Naughty Naughty Girl..' This song is catchy. Mansi Naik has done it with his dancing skills. There is only so much to notice in this movie". Chaitali Gaurav of Loksatta wrote "This story could have been presented in a better way, almost like a farce. But watching the movie, it feels like everything is planned by deciding to show only apathy".

References

External links
 
 

2015 films
2010s Marathi-language films
Indian drama films